Three Sisters is a 1970 British drama film starring Alan Bates, Laurence Olivier and Joan Plowright, based on the 1901 play by Anton Chekhov. Olivier also directed, with co-director John Sichel; it was the final feature film directed by Olivier. The film was based on a 1967 theatre production that Olivier had directed at the Royal National Theatre. Both the theatrical production and the film used the translation from the original Russian by Moura Budberg. The film was released in the U.S. in 1974 as part of the American Film Theatre. This was a series of thirteen film adaptations of stage plays shown to subscribers at about 500 movie theaters across the country.

Cast
Jeanne Watts as Olga Prozorova
Joan Plowright as Masha Kulighina
Louise Purnell as Irina Prozorova 
Derek Jacobi as Andrei Prozorov
Sheila Reid as Natasha Ivanova
Kenneth MacKintosh as Fyodor Kulighin 
Daphne Heard as Anfisa 
Judy Wilson as Serving Maid 
Mary Griffiths as Housemaid 
Ronald Pickup as Baron Nikolaj Tusenbach 
Laurence Olivier as Dr. Ivan Chebutikin 
Frank Wylie as Maj. Vassili Vassilich Solyony 
Alan Bates as Col. Aleksandr Vershinin 
Richard Kay as Lt. Aleksej Fedotik

Production
Sidney Gilliat, who was on the board of British Lion at the time the film was made, said an American investor was meant to put in £100,000-£200,000 but pulled out and British Lion had to make up the shortfall.

Reception
The film was apparently not widely reviewed in either its 1970 British or its 1974 US releases. Following the US release, the prominent critic Judith Crist wrote, "Once again we are faced with a neither-film-nor-play production, but it is, in Moura Budberg's liberal but satisfying translation and under Olivier's semi-cinematic direction, one at very least to fascinate devotees of the play. ... Through several performances, in Geoffrey Unsworth's luscious cinematography (and I mean the adjective in praise of the uncluttered and naturally generated flow his work deserves), and in the pacing there is somehow a sensuality and a sexuality underlying the work that I had not hitherto felt." Molly Haskell wrote that the film "boasts in Joan Plowright's Masha the finest performance I have seen or ever hope to see of one of Chekhov's greatest women characters."

The film lost money.

Home video
The film was first released as a region 1 DVD in 2004. A Blu-ray version was released in the US in 2017.

See also 
 Three Sisters (1994 film), a 1994 Russian language film

References

External links 
 
 

1970 films
Films based on Three Sisters
Films directed by Laurence Olivier
1970s historical drama films
British historical drama films
Films scored by William Walton
1970 drama films
1970s English-language films
1970s British films